The phrase "horse of a different color" means an unrelated or only incidentally related matter with distinctly different significance.

Horse of a Different Color may also refer to:

 Horse of a Different Color (Big & Rich album)
 Horse of a Different Color (Willy DeVille album)
 "A Horse of a Different Color," an episode of the animated television series Rainbow Brite
 "A Horse of a Different Color," an episode in the sixth season of the Showtime television series Dexter
 The Horse of a Different Color, a horse in Emerald City in the film The Wizard of Oz